9 Lacertae is a single star in the northern constellation Lacerta, located 172 light years away from Sun. It is visible to the naked eye as a faint, white-hued star with an apparent visual magnitude of 4.64. This object is moving further from the Earth with a heliocentric radial velocity of +10 km/s.

This is an A-type main-sequence star with a stellar classification of A9VkA7mA6. This notation indicates it has the Hydrogen lines of an A9 star, the Calcium K line of an A7 star, and the metal lines of an A6. It is 513 million years old with a high projected rotational velocity of 105 km/s. The star has 1.59 times the mass of the Sun and about 2.1 times the Sun's radius. It is radiating 34.6 times the Sun's luminosity from its photosphere at an effective temperature of 7,614 K.

References

A-type main-sequence stars
Lacerta (constellation)
Durchmusterung objects
Lacertae, 09
214454
111674
8613